Sheehan is a surname. It may also refer to:

Sheehan Islands, Mac. Robertson Land, Antarctica
Sheehan Glacier, Victoria Land, Antarctica
Sheehan Mesa, Victoria Land, Antarctica
16037 Sheehan, an asteroid
USS Sheehan (DE-541), a United States Navy destroyer escort launched in 1943, but never completed

See also
Sheehan's syndrome, a syndrome affecting the pituitary gland